Harald Bauer (born 24 April 1949) is a German politician of the Christian Democratic Union (CDU) and former member of the German Bundestag.

Life 
Bauer had been a member of the GDR CDU since 1968 and was a member of the Langendorf Municipal Council from 1969 to 1973. From 1974 to 1979, he was a member of the CDU district executive in Wernigerode and the city council in Ilsenburg. From 1979 to 1988, he was a member of the CDU Magdeburg-Mitte district executive and the Magdeburg-Mitte district assembly. From 1988 to 1990, he was a member of the CDU Burg district executive. From 1994, he was a member of the CDU Magdeburg district executive.

In March 1990, Bauer was elected to the People's Chamber for the CDU in the Magdeburg constituency. In October 1990, he was one of the 144 members of parliament sent to the Bundestag by the Volkskammer. He was a member of the Bundestag until December 1990.

Literature

References

1949 births

Members of the Bundestag for Saxony-Anhalt
Members of the Bundestag 1987–1990
Members of the Bundestag for the Christian Democratic Union of Germany
Members of the 10th Volkskammer
Living people